Uberfic (short for uber fanfic, uberXena) or simply uber, über, or ueber (from , for 'over-' or 'supra-') is a genre of alternate universe fan fiction in which characters or events are portrayed somewhat closely to original canon but usually in a different time period, place, or reality, many times featuring the ancestors, descendants, or reincarnations of canon characters, known as uber-characters. The uber-characters' names are never canon.  The term originated in the Xena: Warrior Princess fandom, coined in 1997 by Kym Taborn, the webmaster of the fansite Whoosh.org.  This sort of story was used by the series itself, beginning with the second season episode "The Xena Scrolls".  A common trend in Xena fanfics was to write Uber stories in which the characters' analogues discover that they are soulmates.

See also
Über (disambiguation)
Xena: Warrior Princess
Xena: Warrior Princess The Xena Scrolls (Season 2, Episode 10)
Xena: Warrior Princess Between the Lines (Season 4, Episode 15)
Xena: Warrior Princess Deja Vu All Over Again (Season 4, Episode 22)
Xena: Warrior Princess Married With Fishsticks (Season 5, Episode 15)
Xena: Warrior Princess You Are There (Season 6, Episode 13)
Xena: Warrior Princess Send in the Clones (Season 6, Episode 16)
Xena: Warrior Princess Soul Possession (Season 6, Episode 20)

References

General
Reason magazine article, "The fan fiction phenomena: what Faust, Hamlet, and Xena the Warrior Princess have in common"
Knight Ridder newswire article, "In character: Fan fiction begins where TV series and movies end"
The State newspaper article, "A Dictionary of Fan Fiction"

External links
The Royal Academy of Bards - Alternative Uber Fiction 
PDA Fiction - Uber & Original Stories

Setting
Continuity (fiction)
Fan fiction